Interpipe Group, or simply Interpipe, is a Ukrainian industrial company, a global producer of steel pipes and railway wheels. Interpipe headquarters and production facilities are located in Nikopol, Ukraine. The network of sales offices covers the key markets of Ukraine, CIS, Middle East, North America, and Europe.

Interpipe is a globally important player in carbon steel pipes (hence the name), hollow structural sections, train wheels and steel billets markets.

In 2020, Interpipe sold 469,900 tons of pipes and 192,400 tons of railway products. In-house steel production amounted to 759,000 tons.

11 000 employees work at Interpipe.

Products 
The company supplies a wide range of pipe products in compliance with international standards, including ISO 9001, API Q1, ISO 14001, OHSAS 18001. Pipes are produced according to API 5L, API 5CT, ASTM, EN (DIN), GOST and customer specifications.

Since 2018, Interpipe started producing its own proprietary premium and semi-premium connections - Ukrainian Premium Joint series (UPJ) - for OCTG pipes (Oil Country Tubular Goods) meeting ISO 13679 standard of CAL II and CAL IV level.

Railway products are certified in accordance with IRIS, AAR M-1003 and major railway operators and associations such as Deutsche Bahn, PKP, Ukrainian Railways, Association of American Railways. Interpipe produces more than 250 types of railway wheels, tyres, axles and wheelsets for locomotive, passenger and freight transport. Railway products to key export markets are supplied under a single KLW brand of Interpipe.

Business divisions 
Starting from January 1, 2018, Interpipe has three operating divisions – Steel, Pipe, and Railway Products.

The Steel Product Division includes following production facilities: Interpipe Steel, Interpipe Vtormet, Lime Factory, as well as the departments for metal scrap procurement and steel billet sales. The division is headed by Andrey Korotkov, who holds the position of Director of Interpipe Steel mill currently.

The Railway Products Division includes the wheel-rolling shop and the railway axle and wheelset production facility at Interpipe NTRP, as well as the corresponding sales department. Alexander Garkavij, currently Interpipe’ CCO for Railway Products, is in charge of the division.

The Pipe Division includes pipe-rolling shops of Interpipe Niko Tube (Dnipro and Nikopol production sites) and Interpipe NMPP (Novomoskovsk), as well as pipe sales departments. Vera Smal has been appointed as Pipe Division Director.

The Center for Technical Competencies, responsible for the quality management, investments and R & D, is created at the corporate level. Corporate functions such as finance, procurement and logistics, product and resource management, HR, legal support, economic security, corporate affairs, and administrative support will be structured in Centralized Service Center.

History

On June 6, 2013, Interpipe Steel Mill melted its millionth ton of steel, just 15 months after the launch of the facility.

Interpipe began supplying steel to the United Arab Emirates (UAE) market in the early 2000s with up to 16% of global sales coming from this region. In early 2016, the company registered its trademark in the UAE.

Also in 2016, Interpipe completed a $16.2 million upgrade to facilities in Dnipro with a focus on increased railway related products and production.

In mid-2016 the company announced plans to expand its business presence in Qatar.

Awarded a long-term contract in 2016, in 2017, Interpipe delivered an initial order of 3,000 wheels to the Saudi Railways Organization (SRO).

In 2017, in an effort to combat counterfeiting of steel products, Interpipe introduced an online verification service that customer may utilize to authenticate their steel products.

Also in 2018, Interpipe started the pilot operation of a new line for pipe finishing at Interpipe Niko Tube in Nikopol (the Dnipropetrovsk Oblast of Ukraine). The company invested approximately $8 million into the line construction.

In 2019, Interpipe certified proprietary premium flush connection – Interpipe UPJ-F – for compliance with the international standard ISO 13679 CAL IV (Connection Application Level). 

In 2020, Interpipe developed a new connection Intrepid-SP for the US market.  The Company also has carried out the first delivery of passenger railway wheels for high-speed trains of the national German railway operator – Deutsche Bahn.

References

External links

Interpipe

 
Holding companies of Ukraine
Ukrainian brands
Economy of Dnipropetrovsk Oblast
Conglomerate companies of Ukraine
Companies based in Dnipropetrovsk Oblast